The Kolkata Marathon (officially IDBI Federal Life Insurance Kolkata Full Marathon) is a marathon held annually in Kolkata, West Bengal, India. It was launched in 2008. The marathon is the largest in Eastern India and the only full marathon held in Kolkata.

Organisation

The marathon is authorised by the Athletics Federation of India (AFI). For 2016 edition IDBI Federal Life Insurance will be the title sponsors of the marathon. The marathon is managed by the HighLife Management. The 2016 marathon will also be an official qualifier round for the marathon events in the Rio Olympics 2016.

IDBI Federal Life Insurance is the title sponsor for 2017 edition of the race. Indian cricket player Sachin Tendulkar is the Brand Ambassador for the 2017 marathon.

Participants
The race has five categories of competition. Along with the traditional full and half marathon distances, there is also a 10 km open run, 10 km corporate run and 5 km fun run for children. In the first edition of the marathon, nearly 6,000 runners participated; the number of runners increased to 15,000 in 2015. Only Indian athletes are eligible for the prize money; according to organisers, the aims of the marathon are to provide a platform for Indian competitors and to promote athletics at the grass-root level in India.

Course
The marathon starts from the Red Road in front of the Rangers club. The course then goes through the various landmarks in the city, including historic Park Street, Maidan and the Victoria area.

Past winners 
Key:

References

Marathons in India
Sport in Kolkata
2008 establishments in West Bengal
Recurring sporting events established in 2008